Aqua is an 82-story mixed-use skyscraper in Lakeshore East, downtown Chicago, Illinois. Designed by a team led by Jeanne Gang of Studio Gang Architects, with James Loewenberg of Loewenberg & Associates as the Architect of Record, it includes five levels of parking below ground. The building's eighty-story,  base is topped by a  terrace with gardens, gazebos, pools, hot tubs, a walking/running track and a fire pit.

Aqua was awarded the Emporis Skyscraper Award as 2009 skyscraper of the year, and was shortlisted in 2010 for the biennial International Highrise Award. In celebration of the 2018 Illinois Bicentennial, Aqua was selected as one of the Illinois 200 Great Places by the American Institute of Architects Illinois component (AIA Illinois) and was recognized by USA Today Travel magazine as one of AIA Illinois' selections for Illinois 25 Must See Places. It has been compared to 8 Spruce Street in New York City.

When it was completed, the skyscraper was the world's tallest building designed by a woman. It was surpassed in 2020 by the nearby St. Regis, also located in Chicago and designed by Studio Gang Architects.

Architect 
Aqua was designed by Studio Gang Architects, led by firm principal and founder, Jeanne Gang, and it was the firm's first skyscraper project. The project was the largest ever awarded to an American firm headed by a woman. Loewenberg & Associates are the architects of record, led by James Loewenberg.

Design
The Aqua Tower is located at 225 North Columbus Drive, and is surrounded by high-rises. The result is a building composed of irregularly shaped concrete floor slabs which lend the facade an undulating, sculptural quality. Gang cites the striated limestone outcroppings that are a common topographic feature of the Great Lakes region as inspiration for these slabs.

The building contains  of retail and office space, in addition to 215 hotel rooms (floors 1-18), 476 rental residential units (floors 19-52), and 263 condominium units & penthouses (floors 53-81).  Aqua is the first downtown building to combine condos, apartments and a hotel. Strategic Hotels & Resorts had agreed to acquire the first 15 floors of hotel space upon completion of the building, but terminated its $84 million contract for the space in August 2008, citing significant changes in the economic environment.

Carlson announced May 12, 2010, that it agreed to spend $125 million to open the first Radisson Blu hotel in the United States (Radisson Blu Aqua Hotel) on 18 vacant floors of the highrise. The 334-room hotel opened on November 1, 2011. The building was designed by the lead architect of Studio Gang Architects, Jeanne Gang.

The name 'Aqua' was assigned to the building by Magellan Development Group LLC. It fits the nautical theme of the other buildings in the Lake Shore East development, and is derived from the wave-like forms of the balconies; the tower's proximity to nearby Lake Michigan also influenced the name.  Concrete Superintendent Paul Treacy, was nominated as one of Engineering News-Record's (ENR) top 25 news makers of 2008 for the design and implementation of the exterior formwork to mold the undulating façade of the Aqua.

Sustainability was an important factor in Aqua's design. Gang and her team refined the terrace extensions to maximize solar shading, and other sustainable features include a water-efficient irrigation system and energy-efficient lighting. The green roof on top of the tower base is one of the largest in Chicago. The tower is certified LEED-NC.  Despite its effort to be sustainable, its monolithic concrete slab design without an insulation break transfers heat very efficiently from the inside to outside (winter) and from the outside to inside (summer) due to thermal bridging.  Infra-red images of this building illustrates this concept.

Gallery

See also
 Architecture of Chicago
 List of tallest buildings in Chicago
 List of tallest buildings in the United States
 List of tallest buildings in the world
 List of tallest buildings designed by women

References

External links
 Official Aqua Information website
 Official Studio Gang Architects website
 "Nicole Flores: The Art of Nesting," Metropolis Magazine
 "Gang's Turf is Secure," Chicago Tribune
 http://enr.construction.com/people/awards/2009/0107-PaulTreacy.asp
Illinois Great Places - Aqua Tower
Society of Architectural Historians ARCHIPEDIA entry on Aqua

Residential buildings completed in 2009
Residential skyscrapers in Chicago
Skyscraper office buildings in Chicago
Residential condominiums in Chicago
Apartment buildings in Chicago
Condo hotels in the United States
Studio Gang Architects buildings
New Eastside
Lakeshore East
2009 establishments in Illinois